Petaw Payan, is a developing village in the Nowshera District of Khyber Pakhtunkhwa province of Pakistan. It is one of the main link for connecting the far Southwestern villages to the town of  Jehangira.  It is situated at 33"56'03.91" N and 72"10'39.84" E and 340 meters high from the sea level.

People and Tribes
Petaw Payan is the home area of the Khattak tribes, a family group related to Khushaal Khan Khattak, a poet and warrior.  The population of Petaw Payan is approximately 15000 inhabitants. Pashto is the primary language, but some of the younger residents are fluent in Urdu, Arabic, and English.

Major tribes in Petaw  Payan include Razar, Babu Khel and Kakar.

Environment
Petaw Payan is surrounded by green low and high hills on its east and west. Petaw is an agriculture dominated village with green citrus plants as the dominating earning plant. These citrus plants have the ability to keep environment at its best.

Education
Petaw Payan has four primary schools, one for girls and three for  boys and a secondary school for boys. The local literacy rate is almost negligible at higher level  and is growing rapidly at the lower level with approximately 60%.

Religion
The people of Petaw Payan are Muslims. There are four mosques in the village.

Legal system
Disputes are solved by the Jarga system and there is rarely contact with the courts.

Healthcare
There is no health care center in the Village and residents are totally dependent on the clinics situated in Jehangira and Shaidu to meet their health requirements.

Economy
Agriculture, mining and foreign jobs are the village's main sources of income. Though the young generation is interested in work abroad, and their activity abroad plays a great role in developing the village. Agricultural practices have been shifted from tough practices of vegetables growing that needs plenty of water, pesticides, insecticides, fertilizers and hardworking; to very soft practices of gardening that has less fatigue and more income. Gardening is successful practice because Pakistan is facing energy crisis these days and gardening (growing fruit trees) need less water and thus less energy. Main commercial fruits are oranges and lemon. But people have grown many varieties of fruit trees for their own use and their guests. Non-commercial fruits noticed so far are papaya, pomegranate, grapes, bananas, guava, palm, apricots, grey fruits, walnuts, peaches, almonds, mango, figs, persimmons and zizupus.

Geology
Petaw Payan is located in Attock-Cherat Range.

Geologically Petaw Payan is a buried Valley with gravely soil that produces very delicious fruits and vegetables. Water is this type of Valley has perfect composition like the standard distilled water.
Main lithilogies are slates of Manki Formation of Cambrian age which are mined by local people in the form of grave-slabs.
Limestone  of Khattak Formation is another dominant lithology which is crushed by crushing plants for obtaining cheap, easily accessible and durable construction aggregates.

Slates are broken down naturally into pencil structures  to form another type of construction aggregate "locally known as Shengal" which is mostly used for filling purposes and is being fluently transported to nearby cities.

Recently the PMDC " Pakistan Mineral Development Corporation" has made a commercial discovery of graphite, sulphur and red oxide in the Manki Slates at Western border of the village's territory.  Coal mining has also been started in the area, however, this coal is of sub-bituminous grade.

Transport
Datson ,
Taxis and private cars are the main sources of transport.

References

External links
 https://www.facebook.com/petawpayan?fref=ts
 https://www.facebook.com/photo.php?fbid=1131633351355&set=a.1130941454058.16635.1842907156&type=3&theater

Populated places in Nowshera District